The Polish plumber and the Polish builder are stereotypes of cheap labour coming from Central and Eastern Europe to work in Western Europe. They are both a symbol of the fear that cheap Eastern European labour is threatening the jobs of Western Europeans and a symbol of foreign labour being more affordable and reliable.


Origin
In 2004, a European Union law known as the Bolkestein Directive was drafted, which aimed at establishing a single market for services in the EU which would allow workers to move freely between countries of the European Union. The term "Polish plumber" was used in an article in Charlie Hebdo in 2004, but became popular after French politician Philippe de Villiers used it while campaigning against the EU law:

(Translation: "This matter is very serious as the Bolkenstein directive permits a Polish plumber or an Estonian architect to offer their services in France at the salary level and with the labor laws of their respective countries of origin. Of the 11 million people engaged in the service industry (in France), one million are threatened by this directive, which seeks to dismantle our economic and social model".)

In politics
The Swiss Socialist Party campaigned in favour of the free circulation of people (in the context of European bilateral deals) and also featured a character, with the slogan "Plumbers of all countries, unite!", a reference to the famous slogan from the Communist Manifesto.

An estimated two million workers from Eastern and Central Europe arrived in the United Kingdom between 2003 and 2007, half of them were Polish. The stereotype of the Polish plumber was cited as a factor in the referendum that led to the withdrawal of the United Kingdom from the European Union.

Poster
A Polish tourism board used the stereotype in a humorous poster in 2005 inviting the French to come visit Poland. The designer of the poster was nominated in 2005 for the title "European of the Year" in category "Campaigner of the Year"  and the model,  got his "15 minutes of fame" and a brief career boost.

See also
 Anti-Polish sentiment
 Poles in the United Kingdom
 Poles in France

References

Anti-immigration politics in Europe
Politics of Europe
Tourism in Poland
France–Poland relations
2005 in France
2005 in Poland
Anti-Polish sentiment in Europe
Stereotypes of Polish people